7027 Thornbury Castle was built in August 1949. Its first shed allocation was Plymouth Laira. Its March 1959 shed allocation was Old Oak Common. Its last shed allocation was Reading. It was withdrawn in December 1963 and arrived at Woodham Brothers scrapyard in Barry, South Wales in May 1964. The locomotive was not scrapped and was being restored in 2022.

Preservation 
7027 was sold to the then Birmingham Railway Museum and left as the 23rd departure from Barry in August 1972. After being purchased by Pete Waterman's Transport Trust, she was stored outside the Crewe Heritage Centre in her Barry Scrapyard condition. Some parts of 7027 are currently in use on elder sibling 5043 Earl of Mount Edgcumbe and one set of name and number plates for 7027 are mounted on a wall of the main hall of The Castle School in Thornbury, South Gloucestershire. Following the removal of Waterman's railway equipment from the former LNWR site in 2016, she was moved to Peak Rail in April 2016.

In July 2016, 7027 was purchased from the Waterman Trust for an undisclosed sum by Jon Jones-Pratt, owner of 4936 Kinlet Hall and the revived Crosville Motor Services, who plans to restore the engine to full mainline standards. Restoration has started at the Crosville depot in Weston-super-Mare. In January 2020 no 7027 was once again sold on with plans to be restored to working order. 7027 was sold from Jon Jones-Pratt to a private individual who intends to restore the engine for use at the Great Central Railway. The engine will however now not be mainline certified on completion.

An April 2020 report stated that restoration had started; the project was headed up by the chief mechanical engineer of Great Central Railway, Craig Stinchcombe. Reports and photographs posted in 2022 indicated that restoration was well underway. 

In August 2022, the future restoration of Thornbury Castle was called into question when the Great Western Society's 4709 Group bought the locomotive with the intention of donating the boiler to their project to re-create a GWR 4700 Class.  Thornbury Castle's chassis and other components were to be used to recreate a GWR Star class locomotive, and eventually rebuilding it back into Thornbury Castle when a No. 7 or No. 8 boiler would be available in the future. However, in September of 2022, those plans were cancelled. The GWS also stated that Thornbury Castle could be rebuilt in its own right if someone buys the spare parts.

References

External links
 'Castle' class details, 7000 - 7037 Great Western Archive

7027
Railway locomotives introduced in 1949
7027
Locomotives saved from Woodham Brothers scrapyard
Standard gauge steam locomotives of Great Britain